Jimeno (also Gimeno, Ximeno, Chemene, Exemeno) is a given name derived from Ximen, a variant of the medieval Basque given name Semen, the origins of which arose in the Basque regions, then its use spread west across northern Spain into Castile and Galicia, then followed the Reconquista south during medieval times. It was frequently recorded in Latin using forms similar to those used for Simon, but this is probably not indicative of shared derivation.

History 
Someone named "Seguin" was attested in Frankish chronicles when referring to the Count of Bordeaux and Duke of Vasconia (778, 814 and 816). The name is also recorded in Medieval Latin as Sihiminus, perhaps a misspelling of Ximinus, may have been a local Basque whose family later fled south over the Pyrenees and helped Enneco Arista take over in Pamplona.

Another character is identified in 778 as "Jimeno, the strong", from Arab sources in Al-Andalus, where it calls him "Mothmin al-Akra", a Basque or Hispanic magnate in the upper Ebro territories within the later independent principality of Navarre. This person was possibly related to others near Pamplona in local opposition to both the invading Franks under Charlemagne and the new ruler of the Islamic Iberian realm, Abd al-Rahman I.

Some think the name may be a corruption of the later part of the Latin name Ma-ximinus, as there is late Classic records that various individuals with this name were becoming very active as officials and residents in upper Hispania near the Pyrenees and Tarraconensis during the last century of the Western Roman Empire, and perhaps into the transition from imperial province to independent Kingdom during the Visigothic rule.

Notable given names 

 Jimeno of Pamplona (9th century) nobleman and possible sub-king, founder of Jiménez dynasty
 Jimeno Garcés of Pamplona, king of Pamplona, 925-932

Notable surnames 
 José Joaquin Jimeno (1804-1856), Spanish missionary to the Americas
 José María Jimeno Jurío, Basque anthropologist, ethnographer, and priest
 Pedro Ricardo Barreto Jimeno, Peruvian prelate of the Catholic Church 
 Philip C. Jimeno, American politician 
 Will Jimeno, American author

See also 
 Semen (anthroponym), the given name it derives from
 Jimena (disambiguation), the female form
 Jiménez (surname), a surname representing "son of Jimeno"; as are:
 Giménez; and:
 Ximénez (disambiguation)

References 

Spanish masculine given names
Basque masculine given names